Fosdinovo is a comune (municipality) in the Province of Massa and Carrara in the Italian region Tuscany, located about  northwest of Florence and about  northwest of Massa.

Fosdinovo borders the following municipalities: Aulla, Carrara, Castelnuovo Magra, Fivizzano, Ortonovo, Sarzana.

History
The town is home to a medieval castle of the Malaspina family, rulers of the duchy of Massa. It is also the seat of the Medieval Festival of Fosdinovo (July) and the Forza del Sorriso Festival (Strength of the Smile Festival) (the fourth weekend of August). This second festival is a new, vital festival where the chief theme is the smile.

Near to the castle is the Church of San Remigio, built in the 13th century by the Bishops of Luni. The baroque church contains the marble tomb of Galeotto Malaspina. The Oratorio della Compagnia dei Bianchi (Oratory of the Fellowship of the Whites) was built in the 16th century and features a white marble facade donated by Pasquale Malaspina in 1666.

Sister cities
Fosdinovo is twinned with:
  Sauxillanges, France, since 2003

References

External links

 Official website

Cities and towns in Tuscany